Search optimization may refer to:

 Local search (optimization), a heuristic method for solving computationally hard optimization problems
 Location search optimization (LSO), improving the visibility of a website through location-enabled devices
 Search and optimization, searches that begin with some form of a guess and then refine the guess incrementally
 Search engine optimization, the process of affecting the online visibility of a website
 Search link optimization (SLO), a process by which internal and external incoming links are optimized for search engine algorithms

See also
 Pattern search (optimization), a family of numerical optimization methods that does not require a gradient